Christine Ahn is a Korean-American peace activist and a foreign policy analyst. She is the 2020 winner of the US Peace Prize for her work for peace on the Korean peninsula and her advocacy for women's leadership in peace-building efforts.

Early life and education 
Ahn was born in South Korea and immigrated to the United States at age three. She is the youngest of 10 children, and according to Ahn, her mother, who was the breadwinner of the family, grew up in Korea during the period of Japanese colonial rule and had a sixth-grade education.

Ahn graduated with a bachelor's degree in political science from the University of Colorado, Boulder in 1998, and she earned a master's degree in foreign policy from Georgetown University and a certificate in ecological horticulture from the University of California, Santa Cruz.

Ahn is an American citizen and lives in Hawaii.

Career 
Ahn was a policy analyst with the Korea Policy Institute and a co-founder of Korean Americans for Fair Trade.
Ahn is a co-founder and Executive Director of a non-profit group, Women Cross DMZ, which is known for organizing a group of thirty female activists in crossing the demilitarized zone (DMZ) between North and South Korea in 2015. Ahn and other activists, such as Gloria Steinem and Nobel Peace laureates, Mairead Maguire of Northern Ireland and Leymah Gbowee of Liberia, crossed the DMZ to bring attention to the need for peace between the two nations and for a formal declaration of the end of the Korean War. Critics have claimed that Ahn has not adequately addressed human rights violations committed by the North Korean government and that the event would be used for propaganda by the North Korean regime.

In 2017, Ahn was barred from entering South Korea on her way to China; the Justice Ministry of South Korea stated that Ahn was denied entry because of a concern that she could “hurt the national interests and public safety” of South Korea. Ahn said that her 2015 Women Cross DMZ campaign may have caused the conservative administration of President Park Geun-hye to put her on a blacklist.

In 2017, Ahn organized a letter writing campaign to the Trump administration with female activists from more than 40 countries to defuse tensions on the Korean peninsula and to express their concerns that inaction could lead to nuclear war.

Selected writing 

 Ahn, C., Park, T., and Richards, K., "Anti-Asian Violence in America Rooted in US Empire," The Nation, March 19, 2021
 Ahn, C., "For Biden, the answer to North Korea is now impossible to ignore," MSN, December 18, 2020
 Ahn, C., Susskind, Y., and Wiesner, C., "Opinion: Women of Color Should be the Ones Remaking U.S. Foreign Policy," Newsweek, November 17, 2020
 Ahn, C. and Steinem, G., "Opinion: Women marched for Korean reconciliation. Washington is in our way," The Washington Post, February 24, 2019
 Ahn, C., "While Two Koreas Talk, Trump is Throwing Shade," Foreign Policy in Focus, February 8, 2018
 Ahn, C., "Opinion: Unwanted Missiles for a Korean Island," The New York Times, August 5, 2011

References 

Living people
Year of birth missing (living people)
Women activists
American anti-war activists
South Korean emigrants to the United States
Walsh School of Foreign Service alumni
University of Colorado Boulder alumni
University of California, Santa Cruz alumni
American non-fiction writers
American women non-fiction writers